Stoke Bank is an inclined stretch of the East Coast Main Line (ECML) between  and .

Shortly after the summit, the line runs through the  Stoke Tunnel. It then descends for around 5 miles at 1 in 200 before reaching Grantham station, and then continues on a more gradual descent for around 15 miles, until reaching , which is also near sea level.

Speed records
Stoke Bank is most famous for being the scene of a number of high speed runs by various trains. In July 1998, a trackside sign was erected at the 90 1/4 mark milepost to commemorate the record.

As with Mallard record, this was descending southward from Stoke Bank, but unlike Mallard run, which was a special attempt, this was with a full train of passengers returning from an excursion to Doncaster Works.

On 2 February 1978, the fastest speed achieved by a Class 55 "Deltic" diesel locomotive was attained by 55 008 The Green Howards, which was on a special record breaking run, hauling 10 coaches (343 tons gross). The train achieved a speed of  whilst descending Stoke Bank.

References

East Coast Main Line
Railway inclines in the United Kingdom
Rail transport in Lincolnshire